Nephew Tommy's Prank Phone Calls: Volume 1 is the debut album by comedian Nephew Tommy.  It features some of his most famous prank phone calls requested by fans.

Track listing
Intro - 1:58
N-Word With Lester Tucker - 4:25
Cemetery - 5:53
The Caterer - 4:33
Chubb Rock - 6:56
Curry Goat Birthday - 6:16
Please Don't Come to Church No More - 5:52
Rickey Smiley "The King of Prank Phone Calls" - 6:20
Raymond "Trapped in the Closet" - 7:01
Porter Potty - 4:36
You Hit My Car in the Parking Lot - 6:04
Bonus Prank: K-Miller - 5:42
Benediction - 0:50

References

2012 debut albums
2010s comedy albums
Nephew Tommy albums